Histriasaurus (HIS-tree-ah-SAWR-us) (meaning "Istria lizard") was a genus of dinosaur from the Early Cretaceous (Hauterivian to Barremian stages, around 135-125 million years ago). Its fossils, holotype WN V-6, were found in a bonebed in lacustrine limestone exposed on the seafloor off the coast of the town of Bale on the Istrian peninsula in Croatia by Dario Boscarolli during the 1980s, and described in 1998 by Dalla Vecchia. It was a diplodocoid sauropod, related to, but more primitive than, Rebbachisaurus. Phylogenetic analyses published in 2007 and 2011 placed Histriasaurus as the most basal member of Rebbachisauridae.

The type species, H. boscarollii, was described by Dalla Vecchia in 1998. The specific name honours the discoverer of the site, Darío Boscarolli. Although some authors consider Histriasaurus a dubious taxon, more recent papers support the original classification. 

Histriasaurus would have coexisted with an indeterminate camarasaurid, an indeterminate titanosauriform, an indeterminate somphospondylian, an indeterminate theropod, an indeterminate dinosaur of unknown classification and the foraminiferan Campanellula capuensis.

References

External links

 Histriasaurus at Dinosauria On-Line (Backup at WayBack Machine)
 Histriasaurus at the Paleobiology Database

Rebbachisaurids
Early Cretaceous dinosaurs of Europe
Fossil taxa described in 1998
Paleontology in Croatia